The following bird species are found in the Klamath Basin, Oregon, and related areas; (a few species listed are only "native" and have a larger continental range). The Klamath Basin is within the Pacific Flyway so, over 350 species can be spotted migrating through the flyover.

See also
 Amphibians and reptiles of Oregon
 List of birds of Oregon
 List of native Oregon plants
 Lists of Oregon-related topics
 Audubon Society of Portland

References

Birds, Klamath Basin
Oregon
Biota of Oregon
Birds